Ramon I de Montcada or Ramón I de Moncada (b. 1150 – d. 1190 or 1191) was a Catalan noble from Tortosa of the House of Montcada and a diplomat in the service of the crown. He was head of the House Moncada and the Seneschal of Barcelona from 1173 to 1181.

Family Origins 

Ramon I de Montcada was the son of Guillem Ramon I de Montcada and his wife, Beatriu de Montcada. The House of Montcada was a noble household that would rise to significant prominence in the coming generations in service to the Crown of Aragon.

Biography 

Ramon I de Montcada's earliest appointment was that of Seneschal of Barcelona from 1173 to 1181. It appears that his father, Guillem Ramon I de Montcada held the title immediately before Ramon I until his death in 1173 making the transfer hereditary. Ramon I later served as a diplomat in the courts of Raymond VI of Toulouse, Alfonso VIII of Castile, Ferdinand II of León and Alfonso IX of León. He was involved in diplomacy with the Byzantine Emperor and also managed a failed marriage agreement between the Count of Provence, Ramon Berenguer III and Eudokia Komnene. While he was in Constantinople, he commissioned a translation of the liturgy of John Chrysostom from Leo Tuscus.

Marriage and Descendants 

Ramon I de Montcada married Ramona de Tornamira and the couple had the following children:

 Guillem Ramon II de Montcada - Heir to the Seneschal of Barcelona
 Ramon II de Montcada - Knight of the Kingdom of Aragon and Lord of Tortosa
 Felipa de Montcada - Married Raymond-Roger, Count of Foix

See also 

 House of Montcada
 Raymond VI of Toulouse

References 

 Some of the information on this page was translated from its Catalan and Spanish equivalents.

1150 births
1190 deaths
Ramon I
Aragonese ambassadors to the Byzantine Empire